Sorkhab (also Romanized as Sorkhāb; also known as Sūrkhāb) is a village in Mehraban-e Olya Rural District, Shirin Su District, Kabudarahang County, Hamadan Province, Iran. At the 2006 census, its population was 555, in 103 families.

References 

Populated places in Kabudarahang County